Arkansas Highway 121 (AR 121, Hwy. 121) is a designation for two state highways in Lee County, Arkansas. One route of  runs from the St. Francis River to US Route 79 (US 79) northeast of Marianna. A second routing begins north of Marianna at Highway 1 and runs essentially in a half-loop counterclockwise to LaGrange.

Route description

St. Francis River to US 79
The highway winds northwest through floodplain to terminate at US 79, which is designated as part of the Great River Road.

Highway 1 to LaGrange

The second portion of Highway 121 begins at Highway 1 north of Marianna and runs west through farmland. Highway 121 has a junction with Highway 261 at Holub, after which Highway 121 turns due south.

After running south through a few miles of farmland the route enters Aubrey as Main Street and intersects Highway 78. At Big Creek Corner the route curves east after a junction with Highway 243. Now entering Rondo the route has junction with Highway 243 (Main Street) and serves as the western terminus for Highway 316. The route continues approximately  further east to intersect Highway 1 before it terminates at Young Boulevard in LaGrange.

Traffic counts from the Arkansas State Highway and Transportation Department (AHTD) reveal that less than 200 vehicles per day (VPD) used Highway 121 from the St. Francis River to US 79 in 2010. The semi-circular rural portion from Highway 1 to LaGrange varies between 350–950 VPD.

Major intersections
Mile markers reset at concurrencies.

See also

 List of state highways in Arkansas

Notes

References

External links

121
Transportation in Lee County, Arkansas